Every Kingdom is the debut studio album by British singer-songwriter Ben Howard. It was released in the United Kingdom on 30 September 2011 as a digital download, CD, LP, and 200-copy limited edition cassette. It reached a peak chart position of number four in the UK Albums Chart on 24 February 2013 following his success at the Brit Awards that week. The songs on the album were written by Ben Howard and produced by Chris Bond. The cover art was designed by Owen Tozer, based on photography by Mickey Smith and Roddy Bow.

The song "Old Pine" is the music video version of the original found on the Old Pine EP. A remix of the song by Everything Everything was released by Howard as a single on 20 July 2012. The songs "The Wolves" and "These Waters" are re-recordings of the original versions found on the These Waters EP. The song "Keep Your Head Up" is a re-recording of the original version found on the Games in the Dark EP. The song "Black Flies" was released on 21 April 2012 as a 100-copy limited edition LP as part of the 2012 edition of Secret 7", each copy with different cover art.

The song "Black Flies" was featured in the 2017 Square Enix/Deck Nine game Life Is Strange: Before the Storm's fourth, Bonus episode as the ending song of the episode.

The album was nominated for the 2012 Mercury Prize.

Singles
 "The Wolves" is the first single from the album. It was released in the United Kingdom on 3 June 2011 and re-released on 23 February 2012. It reached a peak chart position of 70 on the UK Singles Chart.
 "Keep Your Head Up" is the second single from the album. It was released in the United Kingdom on 26 August 2011. It reached a peak chart position of 46 on the UK Singles Chart.
 "The Fear" is the third single from the album. It was released in the United Kingdom on 12 October 2011. It reached a peak chart position of 58 on the UK Singles Chart.
 "Only Love" is the fourth single from the album. It was released in the United Kingdom on 4 May 2012. It reached a peak chart position of 9 on the UK Singles Chart.
 "Old Pine" is the fifth single from the album. It was released in the United Kingdom on 20 July 2012.

Track listing
All tracks are written by Ben Howard.

Charts and certifications

Weekly charts

Year-end charts

Decade-end charts

Certifications

Release history

References

2011 debut albums
Ben Howard albums